The K9YA Telegraph is a free, monthly, general interest amateur radio e-Zine first published in January 2004.  The journal of the Robert F. Heytow Memorial Radio Club, the K9YA Telegraph is distributed to subscribers in over 100 countries via e-mail as a PDF file.  Issues comprise original articles written by authors drawn from its subscriber base. Notable among those authors was contributing editor, Rod Newkirk (SK), W9BRD/VA3ZBB, former "How's DX" columnist for QST magazine; Wayne Green (SK), W2NSD, legendary publisher of 73 and other popular electronic hobbyist magazines; and Don Keith, N4KC, best-selling and award-winning author.

The K9YA Telegraph describes itself as unique in offering the amateur radio community a no-cost, high concept publication covering a number of topics unavailable elsewhere and in providing a welcoming venue and readership to first-time writers.

The Telegraph'''s staff includes: Michael Dinelli, N9BOR, layout; Philip Cala-Lazar, K9PL, editor; and Jeff Murray, K1NSS, cartoonist.

Cartoons of K9YA Telegraph cartoonist emeritus (as of April 2016) Dick Sylvan, W9CBT, appear in NAQCC News, the newsletter of the North American QRP CW Club. A collection of Dick's cartoons is reproduced in the book, HI HI—A Collection of Ham Radio Cartoons.

A compilation of Rod Newkirk's articles written for the K9YA Telegraph is published in the book, The Rod Newkirk Collection: From the Pages of the K9YA Telegraph 2004 - 2009.K9YA Telegraph articles have been referenced and reprinted in a number of publications and websites including the scientific journal, Polar Research, Volume 27, Issue 1, April 2008; QRP Labs, https://qrp-labs.com/images/qcx/K9YA.pdf; OT News, The Journal of The Radio Amateur Old Timers Association (UK), Autumn 2021; Proceedings, Fall 2021, Radio Club of America; NFARL eNews, August 2018, North Fulton Amateur Radio League; the exchange, Vol. 5, No. 2, 11/2021, SouthWest Ohio DX Association; Yavapai Signal, March 2015, Yavapai Amateur Radio Club, W7YRC; ARCI NEWS, Vol. 27, Issue 6, December 2007, Antique Radio Club of Illinois; Contester's Rate Sheet, a publication of the American Radio Relay League; and The Keynote, the journal of the International Morse Preservation Society (FISTS). 

In April 2013 the staff of the K9YA Telegraph released their fully revised fifth edition of the book, The Art & Skill of Radio-Telegraphy by William Pierpont, NØHFF.K9YA Telegraph motto: The Good News About Amateur Radio

 External links 
Official Website: K9YA Telegraph
Index
Back Issues
Don Keith Website
FISTS - The International Morse Preservation Society
QTH.NET - Amateur radio e-mail reflectors on various topics
Radio Society Great Britain (RSGB) - Publisher of RadCom
The Role of Radio in Rescuing the Survivors of the Airship Italia; Harvey M. Solomon & Philip Cala-Lazar; Polar Research'', Volume 27, Issue 1, 2008. Pages: 73–74

2004 disestablishments in the United States
Amateur radio magazines
Free magazines
Hobby magazines published in the United States
Magazines established in 2004
Magazines published in Illinois
Monthly magazines published in the United States